Pilagá is a Guaicuruan language spoken by 4,000 people in the Bermejo and Pilcomayo River valleys, western Formosa Province, in northeastern Argentina.

Sociocultural context
The geographical distribution into communities is permeated by pan-Chacoan social organization of people into bands.      	

According to Braunstein (1983), among the Chaco groups several bands constitute a "tribe", identified by a common name and associated by marriage and exchange. He states that tribes have been preferably endogamous, with uxorilocal postmarital residence. Among the Pilagá, tribes have identified with names of regional animals and these traditional denominations persist in present times.

As many anthropologists have noted, the Chaco groups, including the Pilagá, have been hunter-gatherers. Hunting also includes fishing and collection of honey. Hunting is exclusively the domain of men, while gathering of wild fruits, palm hearts, mesquite (prosopis sp.) and firewood is done regularly by women. The major animals hunted are species of deer and armadillos. Among the fish specimens are surubí (Pseudoplatysoma coruscans), pacú (colossoma mitrei) and dorado (salminus maxillosus).

With the advancement of European contact since the conquest, and with the establishment at different times of colonies, farms and missions, Chaco groups, including the Pilagá, began losing their territories. They became confined to smaller portions of lands, and as a consequence, they discontinued their hunter-gathering activities. Today, with sedentarization, Pilagá people combine traditional practices with land-cultivation and cattle-raising at a small scale, and the commerce of basketry, tapestry and wooden artifacts.

Genetic language affiliation
Pilagá belongs to the grouping of Guaykuruan (also spelled ‘Waikuruan’ or ‘Guaicuruan’) languages spoken in the Gran Chaco of South America. The word Chaco, of Quichua origin, means ‘territory of hunting’ (Cordeu and Siffredi 1971:5). The Gran Chaco covers an area of about 1 million square kilometers, of which 50% is on Argentinian land, and the other half distributed between Paraguay, Bolivia and Brazil (Karlin et alt. 1994).  
Out of the six languages that have been claimed to belong to this family, only four, i.e. Kadiwéu (or Caduveo), Mocoví, Pilagá and Toba, are currently spoken. The other two, Abipón and Mbayá, became extinct more than a century ago.

Degree of endangerment
Pilagá enjoys a good level of vitality, being the first language children acquire before starting school. 
However, Formosa's Ministry of Education has not developed key bilingual educational programs or curriculum for the Pilagá. Moreover, only a few schools (six of a total of sixteen) have Pilagá-speaking aides working together with certified teachers as translators. However, the program is rather ineffective for lack of scope or sequence for Pilagá instruction and few didactic materials.

Even though Pilagá use in daily communication between adults connotes solidarity, younger speakers use code-switching apparently to fill gaps in their knowledge of the vernacular language. 
Those areas where Pilagá language and traditions are best preserved are the rural communities. However, the lack of native-language schooling to Pilagá children makes the future of the language bleak.

Phonology and orthography
The inventory includes obstruents and sonorants, totalizing eighteen consonant phonemes, and four vowels. In 1996 the Pilagá designed the orthographic system currently used.

Consonants

Vowels 

Consonants: p, t, k, q, ʼ, d, g, č, s, ʕ, h, l, λ, m, n, ñ, b, y
Vowels: a, e, o, i

References

 Braunstein, José Alberto. 1983.Algunos rasgos de la organización social de los indigenas del Gran Chaco. Trabajos de Etnología 2. Buenos Aires: Universidad de Buenos Aires.
 Buckwalter, Alberto. 1994. Vocabulario pilagá. Elkhardt, Indiana: Mennonite Board of Missions.
 Cordeu, Edgardo and A. Siffredi. 1971. De la algarroba al algodón: Movimiento mesiánico de los guaycurú. Buenos Aires: Juárez Editor.
 Vidal, Alejandra. 2001. Pilagá Grammar. PhD dissertation. Department of Linguistics. University of Oregon. Eugene, Oregon.
 Vidal, Alejandra et.alii (In press). Materiales para la enseñanza de la Lengua pilagá. 3 Volumes (Grammar, Activities, Key and pedagogical orientations). Ministerio de Educación, Ciencia y Tecnología de la Nación. Argentina.
 Vidal, Alejandra et alli. Trilingüal Pilagá-Spanish-English Talking Dictionary, with ethongraphical, grammatical notes and examples. Hans Rausing Endangered Languages Project. Universidad Nacional de ormosa, Argentina.

External links
Lengua Pilaga
Pilagá (Intercontinental Dictionary Series)
Argentinian Languages Collection of Salvador Bucca at the Archive of the Indigenous Languages of Latin America, including audio recordings of stories and word lists in Pilagá.

Languages of Argentina
Guaicuruan languages
Chaco linguistic area

es:Pilaga